WWGB is a Spanish Religious formatted broadcast radio station licensed to Indian Head, Maryland, serving the Washington, D.C. Metro Area.  WWGB is owned and operated by Good Body Media, LLC.

References

External links
 Poder 1030 Online

1986 establishments in Maryland
WGB
Radio stations established in 1986
WGB
Christian radio stations in Maryland
Charles County, Maryland